A Mission for Mr. Dodd is a 1964 West German comedy film directed by Günter Gräwert and starring Heinz Rühmann, Maria Sebaldt and Robert Graf. It was shot at the Bavaria Studios in Munich. The film's sets were designed by the art directors Willy Schatz and Robert Stratil. It is based on the 1962 hit West End play Out of Bounds by  Arthur Watkyn.

Synopsis
In order to penetrate a ring of East European agents who have been stealing military secrets, British intelligence recruits a headmaster who is the exact doppelganger of one of the foreign spies to take his place at meeting. Soon he is deeply caught up in the dangerous game of espionage.

Cast
 Heinz Rühmann as Dr. Lancelot Dodd / Dr. Ivor Marmion
 Maria Sebaldt as Mrs. Parker
 Robert Graf as Toni
 Anton Diffring as Howard
 Ernst Fritz Fürbringer as Sir Gerald Blythe
 Erika von Thellmann as Mrs. Davis
 Horst Keitel as Purdie
 Rudolf Rhomberg as Glenville
 Harry Wüstenhagen as Mr. Bland
 Mario Adorf as Buddy Herman
 Erik Jelde as Hornblow
 Heinz Schorlemmer as Bentley
 Ah Yue Lou as Al Miller
 Edgar Engelmann as Barman
 Rene Frank as Tommy Blythe

References

Bibliography 
 Bock, Hans-Michael & Bergfelder, Tim. The Concise Cinegraph: Encyclopaedia of German Cinema. Berghahn Books, 2009.

External links 
 

1964 films
1964 comedy films
German comedy films
West German films
1960s German-language films
Films directed by Günter Gräwert
Gloria Film films
German films based on plays
Films set in London
Films shot at Bavaria Studios
1960s German films